Hypostomus pyrineusi is a species of catfish in the family Loricariidae. It is native to South America, where it reportedly occurs in the Madeira River basin in Brazil. The species reaches 26 cm (10.2 inches) in total length and is believed to be a facultative air-breather.

References 

pyrineusi
Fish described in 1920